Hypsidia australica is a moth in the family Drepanidae. It was described by Sick in 1938. It is found in Australia, where it has been recorded from New South Wales.

References

Moths described in 1938
Thyatirinae